The eighth season of King of the Hill originally aired Sundays at 7:30–8:00 p.m. (EST) on the Fox Broadcasting Company from November 2, 2003 to May 23, 2004. The Region 1 DVD was released on November 18, 2014.

Production
The showrunners for the season were John Altschuler and Dave Krinsky. The eighth production season was the first to fully utilize digital ink and paint, although four episodes ("New Cowboy on the Block", "After the Mold Rush", "Flirting with the Master" and "Rich Hank, Poor Hank") were Season 7 holdovers from the 7ABE production line and were still traditionally colored. The last of these produced was "Flirting with the Master", while the last aired was "Rich Hank, Poor Hank". 

This season saw Luanne have more of a prominent role again, after several seasons as a minor character due to Britney Murphy's rising film career. In a 2003 interview with Cinescape, Altschuler commented "she [Brittany Murphy] came to us and was actually pitching ideas to us about how to get Luanne more involved in the show. She's just truly a great team player who loves the show and does anything we ask her to do. She's how we got Elijah Wood to do the show."

Episodes

References

2003 American television seasons
2004 American television seasons
King of the Hill 08